Yuan Wemyss (also known as Rita Yuan Gao, Yuan Gao and Rita Pickering; Chinese: 高源; born 14 January 1976) is a former Chinese-born Scottish badminton player who won Scottish National Championships for 13 times.

Career 
Wemyss was a bright sport prospect who formerly played at the regional level in China but never made it up to the national squad due to very tough competition. She temporarily left the sport in 1999 and began pursuing her another interest in learning English at the Carlisle College. In Carlisle she met Scottish National badminton coach Dan Travers who in turn began supporting her for playing further Badminton and represent Scotland at international stage. She there got her nickname Rita, then after dubbed as Rita Yuan Gao. She is also known as Yuan Gao.

As of 2012, Yuan Gao moved to Zurich, Switzerland for part-time study of a Master of Philosophy in Sports Studies at the University of Stirling with a coaching role at Swiss Badminton. She also served as a Woman's ambassador in Badminton World Federation. In 2013, she competed in World Senior Championships also. Currently she is acting as Performance and Development Coach of Badminton Scotland.

Family 
Wemyss comes from Wuhan, a big industrial city in Central China located alongside Yangtze river. Her father was a football coach and her brother was a professional player of Hubei Province. Her mother was a former Army administrator.

Achievements

IBF World Grand Prix 
The World Badminton Grand Prix sanctioned by International Badminton Federation (IBF) from 1983 to 2006.

Women's doubles

IBF International 
Women's singles

Women's doubles

Mixed doubles

References

External links 
 

1976 births
Living people
Badminton players from Wuhan
Scottish female badminton players
Chinese emigrants to the United Kingdom
Naturalised citizens of the United Kingdom
British sportspeople of Chinese descent
Badminton players at the 2002 Commonwealth Games
Commonwealth Games competitors for Scotland